Ichraf Saïed, née Ichraf Chebil (born 1973 Sfax, Tunisia) is a Tunisian magistrate judge, wife of current President Kaïs Saïed, and, therefore, the First Lady of Tunisia since October 23, 2019, following the election of her husband to the presidency of the republic. She is the ninth first lady of Tunisia and the fifth first lady of the post-Tunisian Revolution era.

Biography
Ichraf Saïed was born in Sfax, but her family is originally from Téboulba, a coastal town in the Tunisian Sahel region of Monastir Governorate. She is also a descendent of Saint Ali Chebil.

After receiving her bachelor's degree, Saïed studied law at the Faculty of Law and Political Science at the University of Sousse.

She met her future husband, Kaïs Saïed, while she was a law student in Sousse and taught him constitutional law. They have declared that their marriage was a "love story", not a marriage arranged by their families. According to a social media post by Kaïs Karoui, a close friend of Kaïs Saïed, "The whole outlook of Kais Saïed is modernist and...neither his wife nor his daughter are veiled, not to mention that his wife is a magistrate." The couple have three children - Amrou, Sarah and Mouna.

Saïed's first appearance as First Lady took place on the day of her husband's inauguration as President of the Republic, at the reception at Carthage Palace. A few days later, Ichraf Saïed announced she was retiring, out of respect for the independence of the judiciary, from her position as a magistrate, without a monthly salary, for a period of five years, the duration of her husband's term of office.

She appears publicly on official occasions, including August 13, 2020 during National Women's Day celebrations or on June 3, 2021, with the royal couple of Belgium in Brussels. However, she rarely appears in the media, in contrast with the wives of other former Tunisian presidents.

In September 2021, the president of the Superior Council of the Judiciary, Youssef Bouzakher, remarked on Shems FM that Saïed continues to practice law, contrary to what was originally announced at the beginning of her husband's mandate. Saïed was promoted as a third-grade judge and assigned to the Court of Appeals of Sfax, which she declined. A November 2021 statement from the Council of the Judicial Order noted that she would be appointed to the Center for Legal and Judicial Studies of Tunis.

References

Living people
1973 births
Date of birth unknown
First Ladies of Tunisia
Tunisian judges
20th-century Tunisian lawyers
Tunisian women lawyers
People from Sfax